Amphipolis is a municipality in the Serres regional unit of Greece. The municipality is named after the ancient city of the same name. The seat of the municipality is Rodolivos.

Municipality
The municipality Amfipoli was formed at the 2011 local government reform by the merger of the following 4 former municipalities, that became municipal units:
Amfipoli
Kormista
Proti
Rodolivos

The municipality has an area of 411.773 km2, the municipal unit 152.088 km2.

References

Municipalities of Central Macedonia
Populated places in Chalkidiki
Populated places in Serres (regional unit)